Timothy M. A. McLeod is a Canadian politician, who was elected to the Legislative Assembly of Saskatchewan in the 2020 Saskatchewan general election. He represents the electoral district of Moose Jaw North as a member of the Saskatchewan Party.

McLeod was appointed Provincial Secretary of Saskatchewan on May 31, 2022.

Cabinet positions

References 

Living people
21st-century Canadian politicians
People from Moose Jaw
Saskatchewan Party MLAs
Year of birth missing (living people)